Thamnosophis is a genus of pseudoxyrhophiid snakes found only on the island of Madagascar. , six species were recognized.

Species
 Thamnosophis epistibes 
 Thamnosophis infrasignatus 
 Thamnosophis lateralis  – lateral water snake
 Thamnosophis martae 
 Thamnosophis mavotenda 
 Thamnosophis stumpffi  – yellow-striped water snake

Nota bene: A binomial authority in parentheses indicates that the species was originally described in a genus other than Thamnosophis.

Etymology
The specific name, martae, is in honor of Marta Puente Molins, who assisted the taxon authors in their fieldwork.

References

Further reading
Jan G (1863). Elenco Sistematico degli Ofidi descritti e disegnati per l'Iconografia Generale. Milan: A. Lombardi. 143 pp. (Thamnosophis, new genus, p. 82). (in Italian).

External links

Pseudoxyrhophiidae
Reptiles of Madagascar
Snake genera
Taxa named by Giorgio Jan